The term "versificator" may refer to:

Versificator (Nineteen Eighty-Four), a machine in the novel Nineteen Eighty-Four
Versificator regis, the Medieval equivalent of the Poet Laureate of the United Kingdom
Versificateur, a singer of bertsolaritza